Patjuk is a type of Korean juk consisting of red beans and rice. It is commonly eaten during the winter season in Korea, and is associated to dongji (winter solstice), as people used to believe that the red color of patjuk drives off baneful spirits.

Preparation 

Dried red beans are boiled with eight to ten parts water until fully cooked and soft, then mashed and passed through a sieve. The bean skins are discarded, and the  remaining beans sit for some time in order for them to separate into layers. The upper layer consisting of clear water is used to boil rice, while the lower layer consisting of settled red bean mash is kept. When the rice is cooked, the mashed beans are added back into the porridge along with saeal-sim (literally "bird's egg", named as such due to its resemblance to small bird's eggs, possibly quail eggs), which are the small rice cake balls made of glutinous rice flour. The number of saealsim added is often the same number as the eater's age. Salt is then added to taste.

Varieties 
 Patjuk is often eaten as a meal rather than as a dessert, and by default is not sweetened. Saealsim ("bird's egg"), small rice cake balls made of glutinous rice flour is often added to the dish.
 Dan-patjuk ("sweet red bean porridge") is a sweetened dessert porridge made of boiled and mashed red beans. Glutinous rice powder instead of rice grains is added to the porridge, and the porridge is sweetened with honey or sugar. Saealsim is often added to dan-patjuk.
 Pat-kal-guksu ("red bean noodles") is a type of kal-guksu (noodle soup with knife-cut wheat noodles). In the dish, noodles replace the usual rice and saealsim.

Folklore and traditions 
Patjuk is commonly eaten during the winter season, and is associated with dongji (winter solstice), the day with the shortest period of daylight and the longest night of the year.

Cooking and eating patjuk was also a ritual to prevent bad luck, epidemic disease, and influences from malevolent spirits. People believed that the red color of patjuk drives off baneful spirits, as red was a symbolic color of positive energy which can keep negative energy at bay. According to the story, a man named Gong Gong had a bad son who died on the day of winter solstice and became a disease-spreading evil spirit who was afraid of red bean porridge. People began to make red bean porridge on winter solstice to ward off the spirit, and forestall epidemic diseases. Before eating patjuk, Koreans used to offer it to various household deities such as kitchen god. Patjuk used to be smeared on walls or doors, or placed in a bowl in each room of the house.

The custom of eating patjuk in winter is also related to Korea's long history as an agrarian society. Having a rich harvest has always been a pivotal issue for people, and eating patjuk became a ritual to wish for abundant harvests. By fully relaxing and eating nourishing food in winter, people wanted to be prepared to start farming in the spring. As winter was often the time of rice shortage, the staple in Korean cuisine, patjuk made of red beans, water, and relatively smaller amount of rice was an economical food. The dish also requires no extra side dishes to constitute a complete meal. Patjuk embodies a custom of conserving food.

Although the beliefs on red color and malevolent spirits as well as the agrarian traditions have faded in modern, industrialized society, patjuk is still enjoyed as a seasonal dish in Korea.

Gallery

See also 
 Patbap – red bean rice
 Red bean soup

References 

Congee
East Asian cuisine
Juk
Legume dishes